Pseudopelade of Brocq is a flesh- to pink-colored, irregularly shaped alopecia that may begin in a moth-eaten pattern with eventual coalescence into larger patches of alopecia.

See also
 Cicatricial alopecia
 Louis-Anne-Jean Brocq
 List of cutaneous conditions

References

External links 

Conditions of the skin appendages